Artcraft Fluorescent Lighting Corporation was an American manufacturer of fluorescent lighting fixtures from the time of the public introduction of the fluorescent lamp at the 1939 World's Fair. Artcraft was first to announce a liner showcase striplight fixture and slimline ballast in 1946.

Fluorescent lighting was new to consumers, businesses, and professionals, who were familiar with incandescent lighting.

The benefits of fluorescent lighting were lower operating costs, more light for the same power input, and less maintenance. The company remained in existence until about 2002 in Brooklyn, NY.

The three top fluorescent fixture manufacturing companies from the beginning were, Lightolier [Blitzer family], the largest, a division of Royal Philips Electronics, with approximately $500 million in annual sales, followed by Artcraft Fluorescent Lighting Corporation [Levy family], and Globe Lighting Products, Inc. [Waitzkin family], originating from New York City.

Sources

  

  

 (previous editions published under title: IES lighting handbook)

References

External links

Lighting brands
Manufacturing companies established in 1940
1940 establishments in New York City
Privately held companies based in New York City
American companies established in 1940
Defunct manufacturing companies based in New York City